Nelson Rocks is a large privately owned rock formation located in the North Fork Valley of Pendleton County, West Virginia, United States. The area is operated under the name of NROCKS Outdoor Adventures, and was previously known as Nelson Rocks Outdoor Center (NROC).

Description
Nelson Rocks is at the southern end of the River Knobs, which contain several other similar "razorback" ridges or "fins" including Seneca Rocks, Champe Rocks, and Judy Rocks, all on the western flank of North Fork Mountain.  Nelson Rocks, like all of the river knobs, is bordered by the North Fork Valley on one side and the Germany Valley on the other.  Located less than five miles from the highest point in West Virginia, and surrounded on three sides by the Monongahela National Forest, the mountainous site features two parallel rock fins made of tuscarora sandstone that rise from the mountain overlooking Nelson Gap.  A hanging footbridge 150 feet in length and 200 feet in height spans the corridor between the rock fins.  Visitors can participate in various adventure activities including rock climbing, Via Ferrata climbing, hiking and a canopy tour consisting of 12 zip-lines and other elements.  Lodging at Nelson Rocks is available in the form of hotel-style guest rooms, rustic cabins, or tent camping.

History
Rock climbing at Nelson Rocks dates back about as far as at nearby Seneca Rocks; however, for most of that time, this privately owned area was not officially open to the public. In 1943 and 1944, as part of the West Virginia Maneuver Area, the 10th Mountain Division of the United States Army used Seneca, Nelson and Champe Rocks to train mountain troops in assault climbing in preparation for action in the Apennines of Italy. One guidebook author estimates that they left behind approximately 75,000 soft iron pitons, some of which can still be found on the rocks.

In 1998 the area was purchased by Stuart Hammett who operated it under the name Nelson Rocks Preserve for about a decade. The area was officially open to rock climbing, and route development flourished. During the 1998-2001 seasons, the number of routes doubled reaching about 100 routes. Nelson Rocks was included in Rock Climbing: Virginia, West Virginia, and Maryland, a regional guidebook by Eric J. Horst. and in Rock 'n' Road: An Atlas of North American Rock Climbing Areas by Tim Toula. In the next decade the number of routes reached about 200. Also at the same time via ferrata was built., which included a 200 feet long suspension bridge 150 feet above the ground.

In 2009 Nelson Rocks was purchased by John Hall, owner of Camp Horizons company and reopened as the Nelson Rocks Outdoor Center. and expended by adding new buildings and zip-lines. In 2011, construction was completed on the North Fork Valley Canopy Tour. At the same time the area was closed to all unguided climbing.  Guided climbing can be reserved through the property owner.

Guidebooks

Gallery

References

Notes

External links

 
Popular Mechanics: Rock Climbing the Iron Way
Wonderful West Virginia Magazine: I Came, I Climbed, I Conquered

Rock formations of West Virginia
Ridges of West Virginia
Landforms of Pendleton County, West Virginia
Climbing areas of the United States
Hiking trails in West Virginia
Hotels in West Virginia
Landmarks in West Virginia
Monongahela National Forest
Nature reserves in West Virginia
Parks in West Virginia
Protected areas of Pendleton County, West Virginia
Quartzite formations
Silurian geology
Silurian West Virginia
Via ferrata
Tourist attractions in West Virginia
Zip lines